Lubomyr Taras Romankiw (born 17 April 1931 in Żółkiew, then part of Poland, nowadays Ukraine) is an IBM Fellow and researcher at IBM's Thomas J. Watson Research Center in Yorktown Heights, New York.

Romankiw earned his B.Sc. from the University of Alberta in 1957, and both M.S. and Ph.D. degrees (in metallurgy and materials) from the Massachusetts Institute of Technology in 1962. He is listed as a (co)inventor on over 65 U.S. patents, 150 papers and has edited 10 volumes of various technical symposia.

Background
Much of his work involves magnetic materials, reflective displays and copper plating.  While working for the IBM, the inventor developed magnetic thin-film storage heads (co-invented with David Thompson in the 1970s), a revolutionary technology for recording and reading information on hard drives. He is an IBM Fellow, a member of the IBM Academy of Technology, an IEEE Fellow, and an Electrochemical Society Fellow. He received the 1993 Society of Chemical Industry Perkin Medal, the 1994 IEEE Morris N. Liebmann Technical Field Award, and the 1994 Electrochemical Society Vittorio de Nora Award.

He received the Perkin Medal from the Society of Chemical Industry (1993), the Vittorio de Nora Award from The Electrochemical Society (1994), the IEEE Morris N. Liebmann Memorial Award, the Inventor of the Year Award from the Eastern New York Intellectual Property Law Association (2000) and the Inventor of the Year Award from the New York Intellectual Property Law Association (2001).

In March 2012, he was inducted into the National Inventor's Hall of Fame, one of ten inventors (including Steve Jobs) so honored. In 2014, he was elected as a (foreign) member of the National Academy of Engineering of the United States for his innovation of thin-film magnetic head structures and electrochemical process technologies for microelectronics device fabrication.

He is active in various organizations, most notably serving as the Nachalniy Plastun (or Chief Scout) of the Plast Ukrainian Scouting Organization. Dr. Romankiw is a member of the Shevchenko Scientific Society, USA.

See also

References

External links
 IBM Press Release - Inventor of the Year, NY Intellectual Property Law Association

IBM employees
IBM Fellows
1931 births
Living people
American people of Ukrainian descent
Ukrainian computer scientists
Scouting and Guiding in Ukraine